The 1972 Virginia Slims of Indianapolis  was a women's tennis tournament played on indoor carpet courts at the Indiana State Fairgrounds Coliseum in Indianapolis, Indiana in the United States that was part of the 1972 Virginia Slims Circuit. It was the inaugural edition of the tournament and was held from May 3 through May 6, 1972. The qualifying event for the singles competition took place on May 1 and May 2, 1972 at the Indianapolis Racquet Club. First-seeded Billie Jean King won the singles title and earned $4,000 first-prize money.

Finals

Singles
 Billie Jean King defeated  Nancy Gunter 6–3, 6–3

Doubles
 Rosemary Casals /  Karen Krantzcke defeated  Judy Dalton /  Françoise Dürr 6–3, 6–2

Prize money

References

Virginia Slims of Indianapolis
Virginia Slims of Indianapolis
Virginia Slims of Indianapolis
Virginia Slims of Indianapolis
Virginia Slims of Indianapolis